Carex continua is a tussock-forming perennial in the family Cyperaceae. It is native to northern parts of Asia.

See also
List of Carex species

References

delicata
Plants described in 1908
Taxa named by Charles Baron Clarke
Flora of Russia
Flora of Mongolia